Mirna Medaković Stepinac (born 20 June 1985) is a Croatian actress.

Filmography

Television roles

Movie roles

References

External links

1985 births
Living people
Croatian actresses
Croatian stage actresses
Croatian television actresses
Croatian film actresses
Actresses from Zagreb